The San Juan Islands National Wildlife Refuge is in the San Juan Islands of the Salish Sea, north of Puget Sound, in the State of Washington. The Refuge is managed by the U.S. Fish and Wildlife Service as one of six in the Washington Maritime National Wildlife Refuge Complex.

All but three of the islands are designated wilderness area in the San Juan Wilderness, also established in 1976. Visitors are prohibited, and boaters must keep at least 200 yards from the shore to avoid disturbing the wildlife. Excluded are two state parks managed jointly with the Washington State Park System, five acres of Matia Island and Turn Island; Smith Island; and Minor Island.

The habitats of the various islands range from small rocks to larger grassy or forested islands, some with high cliffs that provide nesting sites for a large variety of marine birds.

Wildlife 
The San Juan Wilderness provides sanctuary for a large variety of animals including species of gull, cormorant, guillemot, puffin, brant, oystercatcher, killdeer, auklet, bald eagle, and harbor seal.

An estimated 200 species of birds visit the islands each year. Harbor seals and whales are common in surrounding water and black brant have historically used the kelp beds for winter feeding.

Recreation 
Recreation in San Juan Wilderness is limited to wildlife watching from afar.  Boaters are requested to stay 200 yards from wilderness when observing wildlife.  Public entry to the designated land is not permitted, with the exception of Matia Island, which is accessed by a cove with a dock.  Matia Island has a  campground and a  trail through the wilderness.

References

External links
San Juan Islands National Wildlife Refuge U.S. Fish and Wildlife Service
San Juan Wilderness Wilderness.net

Protected areas of San Juan County, Washington
National Wildlife Refuges in Washington (state)
Protected areas established in 1976
1976 establishments in Washington (state)